Hojamyrat Geldimyradov, born 1965 in Ahal Province, is  a Turkmen politician. He was the minister of Economy and Finance of Turkmenistan from 2007 to 2008. 

In 1989, he graduated from the Faculty of Economics and Construction Management of the Turkmen Polytechnic Institute. In 2004, he graduated from the Yaroslav Mudryi National Law University in Kharkiv. From 2005 to 2007 he was deputy minister of economics and finance of Turkmenistan.

References

1965 births
Living people
People from Ahal Region
Finance ministers of Turkmenistan
Government ministers of Turkmenistan
Yaroslav Mudryi National Law University alumni